Oliver James Coppard (born 1981) is a British Labour Co-op politician, serving as the Mayor of South Yorkshire since May 2022.

Political career 
Coppard was the Labour candidate for Sheffield Hallam at the 2015 general election.

In the 2022 South Yorkshire mayoral election, Coppard was chosen as the Labour candidate. He won the election, getting a plurality of votes in the first round, at 43.1% and defeating the Conservative candidate Clive Watkinson by a margin of 71.4% to 28.6% in the second round.

Early life and education 
Coppard attended Silverdale School, followed by High Storrs School, before pursuing a Bachelor's degree in Politics and Parliamentary Studies from the University of Leeds.

He is the Board Chair at the Sheffield Hallam Students' Union.

He is a resident of Sheffield.

References 

Mayors of places in Yorkshire and the Humber
1981 births
Living people
Labour Party (UK) parliamentary candidates